Ardy Bernardus Wiranata (born 10 February 1970) is an Indonesian-born Canadian former badminton player who rated among the top singles players in the world (several of whom were fellow Indonesians) during most of the 1990s.

Career 
Quick, supple, and powerful, he won numerous international events and arguably had the best overall record of any player in the first half of the decade. Born in Jakarta, Wiranata trained at the PB Djarum. His achievements began when won the invitation World Junior Championships in 1987 in the boys' singles and mixed doubles event partnered with Susi Susanti. Afterwards, he managed to competing in the senior tournament, by become the runner-up at the 1989 IBF World Championships.

Wiranata earned the silver medal in singles at the 1992 Summer Olympics, losing the final to fellow countryman Alan Budikusuma. He also won the silver medal at the 1989 IBF World Championships, and  bronze medals at this competition in 1991 and 1993. His first-place finishes included the prestigious All-England men's singles in 1991, three Japan Opens, and six Indonesian Open singles championships between 1990 and 1997, where he dominated his teammates. Wiranata also won the Malaysia (1993), Singapore (1994), Korea (1994), Swedish (1997), and U.S. (2000) Opens, as well as the Badminton World Cup (1991) and the World Badminton Grand Prix Final (1994). He clinched the decisive third point for Indonesia against Malaysia in the final of the 1994 Thomas Cup (men's world team championship) in Jakarta. He retired from badminton in 2000.

Personal life 
Wiranata is married and has a son. He is now a badminton coach in Calgary, Canada. Wiranata became a Canadian citizen in 2014.

Achievements

Olympic Games 
Men's singles

World Championships 
Men's singles

World Cup 
Men's singles

Asian Championships 
Men's singles

Southeast Asian Games 
Men's singles

World Junior Championships 
The Bimantara World Junior Championships was an international invitation badminton tournament for junior players. It was held in Jakarta, Indonesia from 1987 to 1991.

Boys' singles

Mixed doubles

IBF World Grand Prix 
The World Badminton Grand Prix sanctioned by International Badminton Federation (IBF) since 1983.

Men's singles

 IBF Grand Prix tournament
 IBF Grand Prix Finals tournament

IBF International 
Men's singles

Men's doubles

Mixed doubles

IBF Junior International 

Boys' singles

Invitational tournament 
Men's singles

References

External links 
 
 
 

1970 births
Living people
Sportspeople from Jakarta
Indonesian male badminton players
Indonesian people of Chinese descent
Badminton players at the 1992 Summer Olympics
Olympic badminton players of Indonesia
Olympic silver medalists for Indonesia
Olympic medalists in badminton
Medalists at the 1992 Summer Olympics
Badminton players at the 1990 Asian Games
Badminton players at the 1994 Asian Games
Asian Games gold medalists for Indonesia
Asian Games bronze medalists for Indonesia
Asian Games medalists in badminton
Medalists at the 1990 Asian Games
Medalists at the 1994 Asian Games
Competitors at the 1991 Southeast Asian Games
Competitors at the 1995 Southeast Asian Games
Southeast Asian Games gold medalists for Indonesia
Southeast Asian Games silver medalists for Indonesia
Southeast Asian Games medalists in badminton
World No. 1 badminton players
Badminton coaches
21st-century Indonesian people
20th-century Indonesian people